Sigered of Essex was the last king of Essex from 798 to 825. The son of Sigeric of Essex, Sigered became king when his father abdicated the throne.

In 812 Sigered was reduced from king to duke by his Mercian overlords. In 825 he finally ceded the kingdom of Essex to Egbert of Wessex.

References

External links

8th-century births
East Saxon monarchs
8th-century English monarchs
9th-century English monarchs
9th-century deaths
9th-century rulers in Europe